Palmyrene is a Unicode block containing characters for the historical Palmyrene alphabet used to write the local Palmyrene dialect of Aramaic.

History
The following Unicode-related documents record the purpose and process of defining specific characters in the Palmyrene block:

References 

Unicode blocks
Palmyra